David Zwilling (born 24 August 1949) is an Austrian former alpine skier and world champion. He won a gold medal in the downhill at the FIS Alpine World Ski Championships 1974 and finished second in the overall 1973 Alpine Skiing World Cup. He competed in the slalom and giant slalom at the 1972 Olympics and finished seventh in both events.

Zwilling was elected Austrian Sportspersonality of the year 1974.

References

External links

1949 births
Living people
Austrian male alpine skiers
Olympic alpine skiers of Austria
Alpine skiers at the 1972 Winter Olympics
Recipients of the Decoration of Honour for Services to the Republic of Austria